The 2016 Singapore Super Series was the fourth Super Series tournament of the 2016 BWF Super Series. The tournament takes place in Singapore from April 12–17, 2016 with a total purse of $350,000.

Men's singles

Seeds

Top half

Bottom half

Finals

Women's singles

Seeds

Top half

Bottom half

Finals

Men's doubles

Seeds

Top half

Bottom half

Finals

Women's doubles

Seeds

Top half

Bottom half

Finals

Mixed doubles

Seeds

Top half

Bottom half

Finals

References

Singapore
Singapore Open (badminton)
2016 in Singaporean sport